Modulator of apoptosis 1 is a protein that in humans is encoded by the MOAP1 gene.

The protein encoded by this gene was identified by its interaction with apoptosis regulator BAX protein. This protein contains a Bcl-2 homology 3 (BH3)-like motif, which is required for the association with BAX. When overexpressed, this gene has been shown to mediate caspase-dependent apoptosis.

References

Further reading